The Corsair is a weekly newspaper produced by and for the students of Santa Monica College, a two-year community college located in Santa Monica, California.  The newspaper began publication in the fall semester of 1929 to provide a media source that focuses on issues concerning the Santa Monica College campus, as well as the surrounding community.  As part of the college's academic curriculum, publication of The Corsair also provides experience as a hands-on training vehicle for Southern California journalism students.

Operation 
The Corsair is the fully student produced community college newspaper of Santa Monica College.  Its creative and journalistic content is directed by a ten-position editing staff, which assigns stories, edits content, and designs page layouts for both the print and online editions of The Corsair.  The majority of the content for the publication is provided by students enrolled in Santa Monica College's Journalism and/or Photography Associate of Arts Degree programs.  Furthermore, The Corsair includes written, artistic, and photographic contributions from other sources including students who are not enrolled in these programs, as well as faculty and alumni.

Publication and production of The Corsair is funded in part through its own advertising revenue.  However, since its inception it has relied on generous faculty and alumni contributions and donations for its equipment, facilities, and 4,000-unit weekly distribution.

Photography 
The Corsair photography department is headed by Adjunct Professor Gerard Burkhart.  The department provides visual and multimedia content for the newspaper, both in print and online.  The photography department is also capable of contributing written content when necessary.  Students majoring in Photography and Photojournalism are given assignments in the same way that writers are, and assignments may or may not include an accompanying writer.

2012 photographers accomplishments:

Michael Yanow, 2011 Student Photographer of the Year from Press Photographers of Greater Los Angeles, 2011 First Place Feature story on "Lucha Vavoom" from Society of Professional Journalists, 2011 JACC First Place in the on-the-spot Sports Competition and others. Yanow provided front line still images from the April 3, 2012 pepper spray incident at Santa Monica College. Images were distributed after publication to the Los Angeles Times and many others through gettyimages.

Paul Alvarez, Jr. 2011 Spot News from the Society of Professional Journalists for coverage of an LAPD officer and an Occupy L.A. protestors confronting each other in a shouting match. Alvarez was also part of Corsair news coverage of the pepper spray incident providing close and graphic video of the chaotic pushing between protestors and campus police. Alvarez was hit directly in the eye with pepper spray but still managed to file the video under deadline pressure. His video gained national prominence.

Chris Alves, First Place Feature JACC Mail-in State wide competition, 2011 Second Place Feature Photo from Society of Professional Journalists with the same image of a   dejected wheelchair-bound Iron Man competitor who was denied entry because he lost his catheter bag.

George Mikhail, First Place Photo Story/Essay JACC State-wide Mail-in contest for 2011 story on Coptic Christian Easter ritual.

Scott Smith, 2011 Second Place Spot News Photo from Society of Professional Journalists for an image of Santa Monica College football players engaged in a fist fight with the opposing team at the end of the seasons last game.

2011 Photographer Accomplishments

Krista Bonelli, First Place JACC Mail-in So Cal Region Feature Photo.

George Mikhail, First Place Photo Story/Essay JACC Mail-in So Cal Region.

Paul Alvarez, Jr., Fourth Place Photo Story/Essay JACC Mail-in So Cal Region.

Awards 
The Corsair's most recent achievements were awarded at the 2012 Journalism Association of Community Colleges State wide Conference, held in Burbank, California.

JACC awards include General Excellence for the Print edition and General Excellence for the Online edition.

Additional Awards have been received from the Society for Professional Journalism.

References

External links
 http://www.thecorsaironline.com
 http://www.smc.edu
 http://www.smmirror.com/#mode=single&view=25788
 http://issuu.com/corsairnews
 http://collegemediamatters.com/2012/04/05/santa-monica-college-newspaper-in-national-spotlight-for-protest-pepper-spray-coverage-the_corsair/
 http://latimesblogs.latimes.com/lanow/2012/04/santa-monica-college-protest-pepper-spray.html
 Lucha Vavoom: http://www.thecorsaironline.com/sports/2011/11/21/lucha-vavoom/
 Football Fight: http://www.thecorsaironline.com/sports/2011/11/22/bowl-game-ends-in-disappointment/

Newspapers published in Greater Los Angeles
Santa Monica College
Student newspapers published in California
Publications established in 1929
1929 establishments in California
Weekly newspapers published in California